Jürgen Melzer and Philipp Petzschner were the defending champions, but lost in the second round to Jamie Delgado and Ken Skupski. Melzer and Petzschner needed a wildcard to compete because they forgot to sign up.

Bob Bryan and Mike Bryan defeated Leander Paes and Radek Štěpánek 6–3, 6–4 in the final to capture the title.

Seeds

Draw

Final rounds

Top half

Section 1

Section 2

Bottom half

Section 3

Section 4

References

External links
2012 US Open – Men's draws and results at the International Tennis Federation

Men's Doubles
US Open - Men's Doubles
US Open (tennis) by year – Men's doubles